Sonata for Two Pianos (1950–51), also called simply Opus 1 or Nummer 1, is a chamber music work by Belgian composer Karel Goeyvaerts, and a seminal work in the early history of European serialism.

History 
Goeyvaerts composed the sonata during the winter of 1950–51, and brought the score with him when he attended the Darmstädter Ferienkurse in the Summer of 1951. There he met Karlheinz Stockhausen, five years his junior and at the time and a student in his last year at the Cologne Conservatory. Goeyvaert's and Stockhausen's analysis and performance of the second movement of the Sonata in Theodor W. Adorno's composition seminar had considerable significance for those young composers eager to develop serial thinking. The influence of the Sonata is also evident in Stockhausen's early serial compositions, particularly Kreuzspiel, which Stockhausen began composing on his way home from Darmstadt and finished on 4 November 1951. Adorno, however, did not appreciate the qualities of the work's second movement, because he could not find any motivic coherence in it. When Goeyvaerts found it difficult to defend himself in German (a language in which he was not fluent), Stockhausen stood up for his friend, telling Adorno, "you are looking for a chicken in an abstract painting".

Although originally titled Sonata for Two Pianos, Goeyvaerts later sought to accentuate the innovative intent of the work by referring to it simply as Opus 1 or Nummer 1.

Material and form
The Sonata for Two Pianos is in four movements, which are simply designated with Roman numerals and metronome markings. Movements I and II are presented in retrograde to form movements III and IV—a pattern that may have been suggested by the four sections of the first piece in Olivier Messiaen's Livre d'orgue.

It is among the earliest examples of multiple or integral serialism, though it is something of a hybrid work. The outer movements relapse into older patterns and do not exhibit the technical purity and perfection of structural organisation found in the middle movements. It was only with his Nummer 2 for 13 instruments that Goeyvaerts found a way of composing in which absolutely everything, from the overall form down to the tiniest detail, is governed by one and the same serial principle. The second movement in particular, with its isolated tones, is an example of punctual music.

The pitch organisation is not based on a twelve-tone row, but rather on a fourteen-note structure, organised into pairs of seven-note sets. With reference to the chromatic total, these sets are complementary, except they both include the two pitches A and E. A possible model is the fourteen-tone series serving as the theme of the variation movement in Schoenberg's Serenade Op. 24.

One technique used in the Sonata to preserve an equilibrium amongst several parameters is the "synthetic number". This term was coined by Goeyvaerts and Stockhausen to describe a homeostatic system based on the reconciliation of tendencies, where an increase in one dimension (e.g., duration) results in a decrease in another dimension (e.g., loudness). The method used in the Sonata involves combining the numerical values assigned to the elements in each of four parameters (pitch, duration, loudness, and mode of attack) such that their sum will always be 7.

Discography
 Fünfzig Jahre neue Musik in Darmstadt. Vol. 1. CD recording. Col Legno WWE 1CD 31894. Includes Goeyvaerts: Sonata for Two Pianos (second movement), performed by the composer and Karlheinz Stockhausen. Munich: Col Legno, 1996.
 Goeyvaerts, Karel. The Serial Works [#1–7].  (Jan Michiels and Inge Spinette, pianos, in Nr. 1). Megadisc MDC 7845. Gent: Megadisc Classics, 1998.

References

Sources

Further reading
 Christiaens, Jan. 2003. "'Absolute Purity Projected into Sound': Goeyvaerts, Heidegger and Early Serialism". Perspectives of New Music 41, no. 1 (Winter): 168–178.
 Delaere, Mark. 1996. "A Pioneer of Serial, Electronic and Minimal Music: The Belgian Composer K. Goeyvaerts." Tempo 195:2–5.
 Goeyvaerts, Karel. 1994. "Paris-Darmstadt 1947–1956". Revue Belge de Musicologie 48:35–54.
 Moelants, Dirk. 2000. "Statistical Analysis of Written and Performed Music: A Study of Compositional Principles and Problems of Coordination and Expression in 'Punctual' Serial Music." Journal of New Music Research 29, no. 1 (March): 37–60.
 Sabbe, Herman. 1972. "Das Musikdenken von Karel Goeyvaerts in Bezug auf das Schaffen von Karlheinz Stockhausen: Ein Beitrag zur Geschichte der frühseriellen und elektronischen Musik 1950–1956". Interface 2:101–113.
 Sabbe, Herman. 1977. Het muzikale serialisme als techniek en als denkmethode: Een onderzoek naar de logische en historische samenhang van de onderscheiden toepassingen van het seriërend beginsel in de muziek van de periode 1950–1975. Ghent: Rijksuniversiteit te Gent.
 Toop, Richard. 1974. "Messiaen / Goeyvaerts, Fano / Stockhausen, Boulez." Perspectives of New Music 13, no. 1 (Fall–Winter): 141–169.

External links
, from The Serial Works Nos. 1–7, 

20th-century classical music
Compositions by Karel Goeyvaerts
Compositions for two pianos
1951 compositions
Serial compositions